The 1998 Red Bull Super Challenge was a professional non-ranking snooker tournament that took place in June 1998 in Guangzhou, China.

This one-off event was held as a six-man round robin. The players who competed were Steve Davis, Stephen Hendry, James Wattana plus three local stars who had yet to make their mark as professionals, Marco Fu, Pang Weiguo and Guo Hua. Davis and Hendry had identical records but Davis took the title as he had beaten Hendry in their individual match.


Round-robin

* Steve Davis won the title on head to head results after beating Stephen Hendry 3–2.

References

Snooker non-ranking competitions
1998 in snooker
1998 in Chinese sport
Snooker competitions in China